The 2022–23 Al Masry SC season is the club's 103rd season in existence and the 10th consecutive season in the top flight of Egyptian football. In addition to the domestic league, Al Masry will participate in this season's editions of the Egypt Cup and the EFA Cup.

Ehab Galal was sacked on 1 December after four rounds due to inconsistent results and was replaced by veteran coach Hossam Hassan.

Players

First-team squad

Transfers

In

Out

Pre-season and friendlies

Competitions

Overview

Egyptian Premier League

League table

Results summary

Results by round

Matches 
The league fixtures were announced on 9 October 2022.

Egypt Cup

EFA Cup

References

Al Masry SC seasons
Al Masry